Dalva Ray Allen (January 13, 1935 – November 28, 2016) was an  American football defensive end who played professionally in the American Football League (AFL). He played college football at the University of Houston. After being selected by the Los Angeles Rams in the 23rd round of the 1957 NFL Draft, Allen played three games for the Toronto Argonauts in the Canadian Football League during the 1957 season. He played for the Houston Oilers on their AFL championship teams in 1960 and 1961, and for the Oakland Raiders from 1962 through 1964.

See also
 List of American Football League players

References

1935 births
2016 deaths
American football defensive ends
Houston Cougars football players
Houston Oilers players
Oakland Raiders players
People from Gonzales, Texas
Gonzales High School (Texas) alumni
Players of American football from Texas
American Football League players
Toronto Argonauts players